Bring your own operating system (BYOOS) relates to the practice of providing PC computers, usually without internally installed disks, so users can bring their own operating system (commonly on USB pen drives) and use the supplied hardware with the operating system of their choice.

BYOOS has been made possible thanks to the ability to create USB pen drives and other external storage devices with 'live' operating system images containing all the necessary drivers to allow boot up and operation on any compatible computer.

Bootable versions of Linux were available by 1993. In 2012, Microsoft Windows 8 Enterprise Edition followed, by introduced Windows To Go functionality to allow the operating system to boot and run from mass storage devices such as USB flash drives thus enabling BYOOS in the Windows family of operating system similar to that of a Linux live CD/DVD.

By allowing users to bring their own operating system there are significant cost savings to be made by organisations who commonly have many on-site users and are obliged to provide them with computer hardware to allow them to perform specific tasks as there is no longer a need to install a hard drive in each computer. Upgrading and maintaining many PC computers has also become easier as companies only need to supply users with new pen drives containing the operating system boot images rather than having to re-image every PC with the latest build of the operating system thus eliminating upgrade costs.

As users can take the USB devices containing their version of the operating system around with them employees can boot up their home computer with the same USB stick so it has exactly the same software environment as they use in their place of work thus enabling employees to work at home exactly the same as they would in the office.

The introduction of cloud based storage, means portable operating systems are free of the need to store data locally. The unbundling of the office application data and other user data from the drives containing the operating systems has been a key factor in making BYOOS possible.

See also 
 BYOD

System administration
Operating system technology